Dallas Moir (born 13 April 1957) is a Maltese-born Scottish former cricketer who played first-class cricket for Scotland in 1980 and 1986 and for Derbyshire between 1981 and 1985.

Moir played for Scotland B in 1978 and in 1980 played several games for Scotland including a first-class match against Ireland and one-day events. Also in 1980 he made his Second XI debut for Warwickshire. He joined Derbyshire in the 1981 season playing mainly in the second XI, but played three first-class matches.

In the 1982 season, Moir played regularly for Derbyshire first team, where he stayed for three years. His sole century innings came against Warwickshire in July 1984. He finished playing for Derbyshire at the end of 1985 but represented Scotland again in 1986, his first-class match being in an innings victory against Ireland.

Moir was a right-handed batsman and played 87 innings in 73 first-class matches with an average of 15.42 and a top score of 107. He played 32 innings in 38 one-day matches. He was a slow left-arm bowler and took 206 first-class wickets with an average of 32.98 and a best performance of 6 for 60. He took a further 22 wickets in the one-day competitions.

Moir's twin brother, Jeremy, played first-class and List A cricket for Scotland in the NatWest Trophy and the Benson and Hedges Cup between 1989 and 1992.

External links
 Dallas Moir at CricketArchive 

1957 births
Scottish cricketers
Living people
Derbyshire cricketers
Warwickshire cricketers
Scottish twins
Twin sportspeople
People educated at Aberdeen Grammar School
People from Mtarfa